Helminiak is a surname. Notable people with the surname include:

Clare Helminiak, American physician
Daniel A. Helminiak (born 1942), American Roman Catholic priest, theologian, and writer
Steve Helminiak, American football coach